Jamie Moore may refer to:

 Jamie Moore (boxer) (born 1978), English retired boxer
 Jamie Moore (jockey) (born 1985), English jockey
 Jamie Amihere Moore (born 1992), English footballer

See also
 117388 Jamiemoore, asteroid
 Jaime Halsey (née Moore; born 1979), British trampolinist
 James Moore (disambiguation)